Claude Dufourmentel (1915–2012) was a plastic surgeon from Paris who described a skin flap for reconstructing rhomboid defects in 1962. This flap has been commonly referred to as the "Dufourmentel flap." He was the son of Léon Dufourmentel.

1915 births
2012 deaths
French plastic surgeons
Date of birth missing
Place of birth missing
Date of death missing
Place of death missing
Physicians from Paris